The 2005 Champion Hurdle was a horse race held at Cheltenham Racecourse on Tuesday 15 March 2005. It was the 75th running of the Champion Hurdle.

The race was won for the second consecutive year by Laurence Byrne's Hardy Eustace, an eight-year-old gelding trained in Ireland by Dessie Hughes and ridden by Conor O'Dwyer.

Hardy Eustace started the 7/2 joint-favourite and led throughout to win by a neck from Harchibald, with Brave Inca in third. The other runners included Rooster Booster (winner of the race in 2003),  Back In Front, Macs Joy, Al Eile and Intersky Falcon. All fourteen runners completed the course.

Race details
 Sponsor: Smurfit
 Purse: £300,000; First prize: £174,000
 Going: Good
 Distance: 2 miles 110 yards
 Number of runners: 14
 Winner's time: 3m 51.50

Full result

 Abbreviations: nse = nose; nk = neck; hd = head; dist = distance; UR = unseated rider; PU = pulled up

Winner's details
Further details of the winner, Hardy Eustace
 Sex: Gelding
 Foaled: 5 April 1997
 Country: Ireland
 Sire: Archway; Dam: Sterna Star (Corvaro)
 Owner: Laurence Byrne
 Breeder: Patrick Joyce

References

Champion Hurdle
 2005
Champion Hurdle
Champion Hurdle
2000s in Gloucestershire